Martin Lloyd Williams (22 November 1947–21 September 2020) was a Welsh chemist and environmental scientist who made important contributions to the science of air pollution and its incorporation into public policy in the United Kingdom. Williams was one of the first scientists to recognize the harmful health effects of ground-level ozone, in papers published in Nature in the mid-1970s, and one of the first to study vehicle emissions in the real world (rather than under artificial laboratory conditions). He also established the first systematic programme to produce inventories of UK national air pollution emissions.

Early life 

Born in Mountain Ash, Williams studied chemistry at University College, Cardiff, took a Ph.D. at Bristol University, and held research fellowships at the University of British Columbia and the University of Bradford.

Government career 

In 1975, he became a government scientist at the Department of Industry's Warren Spring Laboratory in Stevenage, where he headed the air pollution division, before moving to the Department of Environment in 1993. In 2005, he became head of the air quality and science programme at the UK government's Department for Environment, Food and Rural Affairs, where he focused on translating air pollution science into effective government policy, and developed three national air quality strategies for the UK.

Academic career 

In 2010, Williams returned to academia as a professor and Head of Science Policy and Epidemiology in the Environmental Research Group at King's College London, where his research interests included the air quality in London, the measureable health benefits of improved air quality, and the connections between climate change and air pollution. He was also a visiting professor at the University of Urbino, Italy.

Other activities 

Apart from his government and academic appointments, he was chair of the scientific arm of the UN Convention on Long-Range Transboundary Air Pollution (CLRTAP), co-chair of the World Health Organization (WHO) working group on air quality guidelines, an air quality adviser to the US Environmental Protection Agency, and a member of the UK government's two scientific, air pollution advisory committees (AQEG and COMEAP). In 2019, he became one of three Clean Air Champions (alongside Sir Stephen Holgate and Jenny Baverstock) appointed by the UK government's Clean Air programme, tasked with using scientific research to inform practical solutions to the problem of air pollution. Shortly before his death, the Institute of Air Quality Management invited him to be its inaugural Honorary Fellow.

Williams died in 2020 of the heart condition hemopericardium.

Selected publications

References

External links
 Professor Martin Williams: Interview on Air Pollution, UN Economic Commission for Europe (UNECE), 11 November 2013.

1947 births
2020 deaths
Welsh chemists
Academics of Imperial College London
Academics of King's College London
People from Rhondda Cynon Taf
Environmental scientists
Air pollution in the United Kingdom